Surrey-Green Timbers is a provincial electoral district for the Legislative Assembly of British Columbia, Canada.

Demographics

Geography

1999 Redistribution

History 
This riding has elected the following Members of Legislative Assembly:

Member of Legislative Assembly 
The current MLA is Rachna Singh, a member of the New Democratic Party of British Columbia who was elected in 2017.

Election results 

|-

|-
 
|NDP
|Sue Hammell
|align="right"|5,592
|align="right"|36.31%
|align="right"|-13.80%
|align="right"|$37,237

|}

|-
 
|NDP
|Sue Hammell
|align="right"|10,278
|align="right"|50.11%
|align="right"|+3.95%
|align="right"|$36,931

|-

|Progressive Conservative
|Cliff Blair
|align="right"|179
|align="right"|0.87%
|align="right"|n/a
|align="right"|

|Independent
|Don Knight
|align="right"|101
|align="right"|0.49%
|align="right"|n/a
|align="right"|$1,245

|Natural Law
|Ross Ranger
|align="right"|32
|align="right"|0.16%
|align="right"|n/a
|align="right"|$110

|}

|-
 
|NDP
|Sue Hammell
|align="right"|8,708
|align="right"|46.16%
|align="right"|n/a
|align="right"|$32,800
|-

|}

References

External links 
BC Stats - 2001
Results of 2001 election (pdf)
2001 Expenditures
Results of 1996 election
1996 Expenditures
Results of 1991 election
1991 Expenditures
Website of the Legislative Assembly of British Columbia

British Columbia provincial electoral districts
Politics of Surrey, British Columbia
Provincial electoral districts in Greater Vancouver and the Fraser Valley